Radonjić is a Serbian surname, a patronymic derived from the given name Radonja.

Notable people with the surname include:
Andrea Radonjić (born 1994), Montenegrin beauty pageant titleholder who was crowned Miss Montenegro Universe 2011 and represented her country in the 2012 Miss Universe
Dejan Radonjić (born 1970), Montenegrin former professional basketball player and current head coach 
Goran Radonjić (born 1983), Montenegrin heavyweight kickboxer, captain of Montenegrin kickboxing team
Jovan Radonjić (1748–1803), guvernadur of Montenegro between 1764 and 1803
Kristina Radonjić (born 1974), Serbian rhythmic gymnast who competed as Independent Olympic Participant at the 1992 Summer Olympics
Lovro Radonjić (born 1925), Croat water polo player and butterfly swimmer who competed for Yugoslavia in the 1952, 1956, and 1960 Summer Olympics
Milan Radonjić (born 1973), better known as Milan Tarot, Serbian TV personality, comedian, satirist and tarot card reader
Miljko Radonjić (1770–1836), Serbian writer, professor at the Belgrade Higher School and politician
Nemanja Radonjić (born 1996), Serbian football forward who plays for Olympique de Marseille
Nenad Radonjić (born 1996), Serbian football forward who plays for Radnički Beograd, on loan from Voždovac
Srđan Radonjić (born 1981), Montenegrin former professional footballer who played as striker
Staniša Radonjić (1650s–1720s), Serbian Orthodox priest, chieftainvojvoda of the Njeguši tribe, and serdar of the Prince-Bishopric of Montenegro
Stanislav Radonjić (1690–1758), vojvoda, serdar and the first guvernadur (governor) of the Prince-Bishopric of Montenegro from 1756 until he died in 1758, serving Metropolitan Sava II Petrović-Njegoš
Vladan Radonjić (born 1979), Serbian professional strength and conditioning coach
Vukolaj Radonjić (1765–1832), last Montenegrin guvernadur

Serbian surnames
Montenegrin surnames
Patronymic surnames
Croatian surnames